Bernie the Dolphin 2 is a 2019 Canadian-American action comedy film directed by Kirk Harris and starring Lola Sultan, Patrick Muldoon, Logan Allen and Kevin Sorbo.  It is a sequel to the 2018 film Bernie the Dolphin.

Summary
The kids are thrilled that Bernie has come back. But so has their old enemy Winston, who's about to kidnap the talented dolphin. Kevin and Holly must rescue their splashy friend before it's too late.

Plot
One year after meeting Bernie the Dolphin, Kevin and Holly Ryan join the team at Marineland, the local aquarium, and they discover that Bernie has returned. But their dad's old boss and former enemy Winston Mills has been released from prison and is ordered by the court to work at the aquarium and live in an apartment under house arrest.

His parole officer Mason Jacks brings Winston to work at Marineland the next day, which Bob and the kids object to, but Winston claims he's a changed man and wants a second chance, and their mom Abby wants the kids to forgive him, to which they reluctantly agree. Kevin also expresses interest in playing football to impress a cheerleader that he has a crush on.

Winston then starts work at Marineland with Bob and the kids in charge of him, which Holly takes advantage of by having the dolphins mess around with him. He's later approached by Devin Cruz, a former businessman who was the mastermind of the chemical plant plan from the previous year who arranged to have Winston released and he wants his help to steal Bernie and offers him money, which Kevin and Holly plan to investigate.

Meanwhile, Kevin's crush Ellie and her friend Harper went on a boat and wound up lost at sea, and Bernie and his pod find them stranded on an island, and gets Bob and the kids to rescue them on their boat and get interviewed by local reporter Summer Sands and Ellie kisses Kevin on the cheek, which Holly teases him about and he later starts practicing football with his dad.

Winston finds out his apartment is being fumigated and Cruz approaches him and tells him to steal Kevin's GPS device and gets Mason to arrange Winston to temporarily live at Marineland, which Bob reluctantly agrees to.

One of Cruz's accomplices, Frankie Franklin, rents a boat with a tank from Abby, which they plan to use to steal Bernie. Meanwhile, Winston starts to warm up to the sea mammals by learning to feed the dolphin Rascal and meets the sea turtles Rocky and Pokey, and Bob says he's starting to do a good job.

The next day, Cruz arranges for someone to go to Marineland to meet Winston and get the GPS code, so he takes Kevin's phone. And Marineland's parrot, Mango, tells Kevin and Holly about Winston meeting Frankie at the marina to kidnap Bernie.

Winston meets Cruz at Marineland and gives him Kevin's phone, but refuses to accept his money and tells him to stay away from the dolphins. Kevin and Holly then run off to the hotel where Cruz is staying at and they sneak into his room and hack into his computer and discover that he and Frankie want to sell Bernie to a Marine Park in South America.

Meanwhile, Frankie siphons gas from Bob and Abby's boat before they go out to sea, and they run out of gas, leaving them stranded. Kevin and Holly sneak onto Frankie's boat, where Abby calls Kevin's phone, but Frankie answers it and then she calls Winston to go look for the kids with encouragement with Rascal, and Bernie finds Bob and Abby and Bob tells him to go find the kids.

Mason finds out that Winston left Marineland and Kevin and Holly are captured by Cruz and Winston tells Mason that the kids are in trouble and they find them and Kevin uses a football tackle on Cruz and Mason cuffs him and Winston allows Mason to cuff him too for violating his parole. The Coast Guard rescues the parents with help from Bernie and his pod.

Cruz is arrested, but the kids tell Mason to release Winston for rescuing them and they finally accept him as a friend and they all wave goodbye to Bernie and his pod.

Cast
Lola Sultan as Holly Ryan
Patrick Muldoon as Bob Ryan
Logan Allen as Kevin Ryan
Kevin Sorbo as Winston Mills
Dahlia Legault as Abby Ryan
Tommi Rose as Ellie

Release
The film was released on DVD, On Demand and digital platforms on December 17, 2019.

Reception
Renee Schonfeld of Common Sense Media awarded the film two stars out of five.

References

External links
 
 

Films about dolphins
2010s English-language films